Newton LeGayet Mackay (1832 – May 20, 1886) was a Canadian lawyer and political figure. He represented Cape Breton in the House of Commons of Canada from 1872 to 1878 as a Conservative and then Liberal member.

He was born in Halifax, Nova Scotia, the son of William McKay, and was educated there. Mackay was called to the Nova Scotia bar in 1859 and named a Queen's Counsel in 1872. He ran unsuccessfully for a seat in the Nova Scotia assembly in 1867 and 1871 before he was elected to the House of Commons. Mackay became a Liberal following the Pacific Scandal. After his defeat by Hugh McLeod in 1878, he was an unsuccessful candidate in each subsequent federal election until his death in 1886 in Sydney. In 1879, he married Kate Bown. Mackay served as treasurer for Cape Breton County.

Electoral record

References 

1832 births
1886 deaths
Conservative Party of Canada (1867–1942) MPs
Liberal Party of Canada MPs
Members of the House of Commons of Canada from Nova Scotia
Canadian King's Counsel